The cacomistle (Bassariscus sumichrasti), also spelled cacomixtle, is a nocturnal, arboreal and omnivorous member of the carnivoran family Procyonidae. Its preferred habitats are wet, tropical, evergreen woodlands and mountain forests, though seasonally it will venture into drier deciduous forests.

Nowhere in its range (from southern Mexico to western Panama) is B. sumichrasti common. This is especially true in Costa Rica, where it inhabits only a very small area. It is completely dependent on forest habitat, making it particularly susceptible to deforestation.

The term cacomistle is from the Nahuatl language (tlahcomiztli) and means "half cat" or "half mountain lion"; it is sometimes also used to refer to the ringtail, Bassariscus astutus, a similar species that inhabits arid northern Mexico and the American Southwest.

Taxonomy
The cacomistle is part of the family Procyonidae which includes other small omnivores such as the raccoon and the coati. The cacomistle and its close relative, the ringtail, are the only living species of the subfamily Procyoninae and the genus Bassariscus. Within the Cacomistle species there are 5 subspecies (Bassariscus sumichrasti variabilis, Bassariscus sumichrasti sumichrasti, Bassariscus sumichrasti oaxacensis, Bassariscus sumichrasti notinus, and Bassariscus sumichrasti latrans).

Description

This species of cacomistle's body is 38–47 cm in length, which is attached to a tail of approximately the same length, if not longer (typically 39–53 cm long). The male cacomistle is often slightly longer than its female counterpart, however both male and female have approximately the same weight, usually between 1 and 1.5 kg. Their body consists of dark brown and grey fur, which stands as a stark contrast to the black and white striped tail. The tail stripes are the most defined near the animal's posterior end and gradually fade to a solid black at the end of the tail. The cacomistle is often confused with its close relative the Ring-tailed cat (Scientific name: Bassariscus astutus) because of the similarity of their appearance, but unlike the ring-tail cat the cacomistle does not have retractable claws. The cacomistle can also be identified by its faded tail and the observation of ears that come to a point.

Distribution and habitat
The cacomistle inhabits the tropical forests of North America and Central America, from south-central Mexico to Panama. These animals are quite solitary and thus spread themselves out, with each cacomistle having a home range of at least 20 hectares (an area equivalent to 20 sports fields) and are typically seen in the middle and upper levels of the canopy. Throughout their broad range this species is found to inhabit a wide variety of different forest ecosystems. In Mexico, the cacomistle tends to avoid oak forests, secondary forest, and overgrown pastures, but in Costa Rica, the cacomistle has been shown to favor those exact habitats.

Diet
Cacomistles are considered generalist feeders, because they can survive on a wide variety of different foods. The diet of this species consists primarily of fruits, insects, small vertebrates such as reptiles, amphibians, and rodents, the specificity of these food options depends on what is available in the particular habitat in which an individual dwells. The bromeliad is an excellent reservoir for food in the southern edge of the cacomistle's range, as these plants naturally collect water, insects and small animals found high in the canopy.

Reproduction
Mating season is the only time cacomistles interact with each other, and it is only briefly as the female is only receptive to male approaches for one day. After mating, the female cacomistle undergoes a gestation period of approximately two months before giving birth to a single offspring. When the cub is three months old it is weaned, and then taught hunting and survival skills by its mother before going off to develop its own territory.

References

External links

Further Cacomistle information

Procyonidae
Carnivorans of Central America
Carnivorans of North America
Mammals of Mexico
Least concern biota of North America
Mammals described in 1860